Scotland Loves Animation is a charity that promotes anime in Scotland. They hold an annual film festival called "Scotland Loves Anime" (often abbreviated to SLA) in October and work with other festivals to programme anime content into their schedules. It will celebrate its 13th festival in 2023, which is currently scheduled to take place between 3 and 5 November in Glasgow and 6 and 12 November in Edinburgh.

In May 2020, Anime Limited launched a new online festival in partnership with Scotland Loves Animation, called Screen Anime. This service hosted 4 films and one TV series monthly. It was available in the UK and Ireland only. The service ended on 25 May 2021, as cinemas reopened in the UK.

Background
Scotland Loves Animation is a charity that promotes anime in Scotland, through hosting an annual film festival October and partnering with film festivals and other independent cinemas to screen anime-related content during the rest of the year. The festival was established in 2010 by Andrew Partridge, who later went on to start the Glasgow-based anime distributor Anime Limited. The main festival is based across of Scotland's two biggest cities: Glasgow and Edinburgh. 

They host Education Days that run as part of the festival where the public can meet industry professionals in a full day of talks, panel discussions, and workshops. Previous guests have included The Garden of Words director Makoto Shinkai and Promare director Hiroyuki Imaishi. The festival also regularly invites directors to host Q&A sessions after their films have been screened. Previous Q&A sessions have included Naoko Yamada after the European Premiere of K-On! the Movie and Tomoki Kyoda after the European Premiere of Eureka Seven: Hi-Evolution Movie 1. In addition to this, Jonathan Clements usually speaks before each film screening to share his insight about the director and films being shown.

They have also screened films in partnership with other festivals such as the Glasgow Film Festival at the Glasgow Film Theatre and the Discovery Film Festival at the DCA.

The Jury Award, called the Golden Partridge is named after Andrew Partridge, the founder of the festival.

Event locations and venues
The "Scotland Loves Anime" film festival takes place every October in Glasgow and Edinburgh. The festival typically runs over a weekend in Glasgow, and over a week in Edinburgh. In Edinburgh they will show more films due to the greater number of film slots available. Because of the limited runs of anime films in cinemas outside of Japan, this is often the only chance to see many of these films at the cinema. Screenings for popular films are often sold-out long before the date of showing.

The festival is held in the Glasgow Film Theatre in Glasgow and the in The Cameo in Edinburgh. The Edinburgh Filmhouse hosted the Edinburgh festival from 2010 to 2021 and the Belmont Filmhouse hosted the Aberdeen festival from 2015 to 2020, but in October 2022 the Centre for the Moving Image went into administration, closing these cinemas.

Other events have included a festival in Aberdeen and a touring festival across the country. The latter was brought back in 2021 and saw various Picturehouse locations around the country screen the most popular films of the 2021 festival.

The 2023 festival will be held in November for the first time.

Previous festivals

2020 Festival
Due to the 2020 Coronavirus Pandemic, the 2020 Scotland Loves Anime festival was held online. A small number of physical screenings were scheduled to be held, but they were all ultimately cancelled. The online part of the film festival was held in partnership with Screen Anime, a streaming service set up by Anime Limited earlier in the year. The online portion of the festival was held between 25 October 2020 and 25 November 2020. Two-thirds of the funds raised from the online festival was donated to the Glasgow Film Theatre and the Edinburgh Filmhouse.

The films that screened as part of Scotland Loves Anime on Screen Anime were:

 Love Live! Sunshine!! The School Idol Movie: Over the Rainbow
 Love Live! The School Idol Movie
 Lupin III vs. Detective Conan: The Movie
 Lupin III: The Secret of Mamo
 Lupin III: The Woman Called Fujiko Mine (TV Series)
 Lupin III: The Woman Called Fujiko Mine - Fujiko's Lie
 Lupin III: The Woman Called Fujiko Mine - Goemon's Blood Spray
 Lupin III: The Woman Called Fujiko Mine - Jigen's Gravestone
 Patema Inverted
 Penguin Highway
 Production I.G Short Film Collection
 Weathering with You (featuring a commentary by Jonathan Clements)

The digital festival also featured two in progress films, Inu-Oh (Science SARU) and Josee, the Tiger and the Fish (Bones).

The physical festival was scheduled to be run on 7–8 November in Edinburgh and Aberdeen and 14–15 November in Glasgow, but these screenings were cancelled due to the tightening of Coronavirus restrictions throughout the UK. Lupin III: The First and On-Gaku: Our Sound were scheduled to be screened at these cinemas

References

External links
 Scotland Loves Animation homepage
Anime Limited Website

Animation film festivals in the United Kingdom
Film festivals in Edinburgh
Film festivals in Glasgow
Film festivals established in 2010